Ice Cream, I Scream is a 2006 Turkish comedy film written and directed by Yüksel Aksu and starring Turan Özdemir, the film's sole professional actor; the rest being residents of Muğla, Turkey.

The film was Turkey's official submission for the Academy Award for Best Foreign Language Film at the 79th Academy Awards, but it was not nominated.

Plot
Ali, who is ice cream salesman in Muğla, tries to survive in the face of fierce competition from the big ice cream brands. While trying to promote his ice cream, he tours the village with his brand new yellow ice cream motorbike. However the naughty boys of the town who are chasing him to have free ice cream, steal the motorbike while he is away. Still repaying the debts for the loan on his motorbike, Ali becomes furious and accuses the big ice cream brands of stealing the car in order to destroy him. He starts investigating the theft of his motorbike asking one by one to the sellers of the big brands, while all along the naughty boys are enjoying their free ice cream.

Cast
 Turan Özdemir as Ali
 Nejat Altinsoy as Komunist Mustafa
 Mehmet Amca as Arif Dede
 Levent Aras as Coban
 Ayse Aslan as the mother
 Gulnihal Demir as Canfeda
 Arap Fevzi as Arap Fevzi
 Ulas Saribas as Kamil
 Recep Yener as Imam
 Metin Yildiz as Gasteci Metin
 Ali Sefik Tavil as Kamil Baba
 Ismet Can Suda as Tingoz Kerim

Awards
After gaining a submission for the Academy Awards,  Dondurmam Gaymak was chosen to be the opening movie at the Queens Film Festival, as well as winning two Queens Spirit awards including Best Comedy Director for Yüksel Aksu and Best Comedy Film. It won a Special Jury award at Istanbul International Film Festival, and won an Ankara Movie Awards for Special Jury Awards, People's Jury Awards and Best Actor (Turan Özdemir).

See also

 Cinema of Turkey
 List of submissions to the 79th Academy Awards for Best Foreign Language Film

References

External links
 
 
 

2006 films
2000s Turkish-language films
2006 comedy films
Turkish comedy films
Films set in Turkey
Films shot in Turkey
Muğla Province